The Church of Our Lady of Snow is a Roman Catholic Marian church in Kallikulam, Tirunelveli district,[Tuticorin diocese], Tamil Nadu, India. It is one of the Catholic pilgrimage centres in India dedicated to the Blessed Virgin Mary. In Tamil 'Pani' means 'Snow' and 'Matha' means 'Mother'.

History
People inhabited Kallikulam as early as 1700 AD. In 1770 AD, a thatched church was built in the name of Holy Mary by village people. In 1884, Kallikulam villagers and Jesuit Missionaries decided to build a new church at Kallikulam for Mother Mary. In 1886, a church was constructed in that place and consecrated to Our Lady of Snow. Every year, the annual feast of Our Lady of Snow is celebrated from 27 July to 5 August.

Apparition
An oral tradition in Tamil Nadu states that on 29 March 1939 around 6.30 pm, six young people claim that they saw the Mother Mary appear on a hill near to the Church.People from different part of India visit Apparition hill on first Saturday of every month.

See also
 Roman Catholic Marian churches
 Marian apparitions

References

External links

athisayapanimatha.com
panichaaral.com
Panimatha.com
Kallikulam.com

Roman Catholic churches in Tamil Nadu
Shrines to the Virgin Mary
Tirunelveli
Roman Catholic shrines in India